Winkie may refer to:


Arts and entertainment
 Winkie Country, a place in the Wizard of Oz novels by L. Frank Baum, and its residents (Winkies)
 the title character of Wee Willie Winkie, an 1841 Scottish nursery rhyme
 Winkie (novel), a 2006 novel by Clifford Chase about a teddy bear accused of terrorism
 "Winkie", a 2006 short story by Margo Lanagan
 The Winkies, a British rock group

People
 Winkie Direko (1929–2012), South African politician
 nickname of Winkie Dodds (born 1958), Northern Irish loyalist activist
 nickname of Winifred Griffin (1932–2018), New Zealand swimmer
 nickname of Winkie Wilkins (born 1941), American politician

Other uses
 Winkie, South Australia, a locality
 Winkie (pigeon), a Dickin Medal-winning pigeon
 American slang for the penis
 "Winkies", a nickname of Winchester College football

See also
 Winky (disambiguation)

Lists of people by nickname